Kenneth Bertram Scott (17 August 1915 – 9 August 1943) was an English cricketer active from 1935 to 1937 who played for Sussex. He was born in Uckfield, Sussex and died during the Second World War near Syracuse, Sicily. He appeared in fourteen first-class matches as a righthanded batsman who bowled right-arm medium pace. He scored 274 runs with a highest score of 56 and took twelve wickets with a best performance of two for 13.

Scott was killed in World War II

Notes

1915 births
1943 deaths
English cricketers
Sussex cricketers
Oxford University cricketers
Free Foresters cricketers
Alumni of Trinity College, Oxford
British Army personnel killed in World War II
Queen's Own Royal West Kent Regiment officers
Military personnel from Sussex